Wildhorse Township is a township in St. Louis County, in the U.S. state of Missouri. Its population was 36,725 as of the 2010 census.

References

 

Townships in Missouri
Townships in St. Louis County, Missouri